The 2012–13 San Antonio Spurs season was the 46th season of the franchise, 40th in San Antonio and 37th in the National Basketball Association (NBA). The Spurs finished the regular season with a 58–24 record as the 2nd seed in the Western Conference.

In the playoffs, the Spurs swept the Los Angeles Lakers in the First Round in four games, defeated the Golden State Warriors in the Semifinals in six games, and swept the Memphis Grizzlies in the Conference Finals in four games, advancing to the NBA Finals for the fifth time in franchise history since 2007, but came up short of a fifth title, losing to the Miami Heat in a tough seven-game series, who would hand them their very first defeat in the NBA Finals.

Key dates

 June 28, 2012: The 2012 NBA draft takes place at Prudential Center in Newark, New Jersey.
 November 21, 2012: The Spurs signed James Anderson.
 December 20, 2012: The Spurs waived James Anderson.
 January 22, 2013: The Spurs signed Aron Baynes.
 March 14, 2013: With a 92-91 defeat of rival Dallas Mavericks the Spurs extended their NBA record to 14 consecutive 50+ win seasons, also clinching a playoff spot, their 16th straight postseason appearance, their 33rd overall.
 April 6, 2013: With a 99-97 defeat of the Atlanta Hawks, the Spurs won the Southwest Division for the sixth time (the fourth in five years), the 19th overall division title in 37 years of play in the NBA.
 April 12, 2013: The Spurs waived Stephen Jackson.
 April 17, 2013: The Spurs signed Tracy McGrady.

Draft picks

Roster

Regular season

Standings

Game log

|- style="background:#cfc;"
| 1 || October 31 || @ New Orleans
| 
| Tim Duncan (24)
| Tim Duncan (11)
| Boris Diaw, Tony Parker (6)
| New Orleans Arena15,358
| 1–0

|- style="background:#cfc;"
| 2 || November 1 || Oklahoma City
| 
| Tim Duncan (20)
| Tim Duncan (8)
| Tony Parker (11)
| AT&T Center18,581
| 2–0							
|- style="background:#cfc;"								
| 3 || November 3 || Utah
| 
| Tony Parker (24)
| Tim Duncan (11)
| Tony Parker (10)
| AT&T Center18,581
| 3–0							
|- style="background:#cfc;"								
| 4 || November 5 || Indiana
| 
| Gary Neal (17)
| Tim Duncan, DeJuan Blair (11)
| Manu Ginóbili, Tony Parker (7)
| AT&T Center17,158
| 4–0								
|- style="background:#fcc;"								
| 5 || November 7 || @ L. A. Clippers
| 
| Danny Green (12)
| DeJuan Blair (7)
| Tony Parker (6)
| Staples Center19,060
| 4-1								
|- style="background:#cfc;"								
| 6 || November 9 || @ Sacramento
| 
| Tim Duncan (23)
| Tim Duncan (12)
| Tony Parker (6)
| Sleep Train Arena13,505
| 5-1								
|- style="background:#cfc;"						
| 7 || November 10 || @ Portland
| 
| Gary Neal (27)
| Tim Duncan (9)
| Patrick Mills, Manu Ginóbili (4)
| Rose Garden20,447
| 6-1									
|- style="background:#cfc;"							
| 8 || November 13 || @ L. A. Lakers
| 
| Tony Parker (19)
| Tim Duncan, Tiago Splitter (9)
| Tony Parker (7)
| Staples Center18,997
| 7-1								
|- style="background:#fcc;"								
| 9 || November 15 || New York
| 
| Tony Parker (19)
| Tim Duncan (14)
| Tony Parker (12)
| AT&T Center18,581
| 7-2								
|- style="background:#cfc;"									
| 10 || November 17 || Denver
| 
| Manu Ginóbili (20)
| Stephen Jackson (9)
| Tony Parker (6)
| AT&T Center18,581
| 8-2								
|- style="background:#fcc;"							
| 11 || November 19 || L. A. Clippers
| 
| Tim Duncan (20)
| Tim Duncan (14)
| Tony Parker (6)
| AT&T Center17,920
| 8-3								
|- style="background:#cfc;"								
| 12 || November 21 || @ Boston
| 
| Tony Parker (26)
| Tim Duncan (15)
| Tony Parker (6)
| TD Garden18,624
| 9-3								
|- style="background:#cfc;"								
| 13 || November 23 || @ Indiana
| 
| Tony Parker (33)
| Tim Duncan (17)
| Tony Parker (10)
| Bankers Life Fieldhouse17,082
| 10-3								
|- style="background:#cfc;"							
| 14 || November 25 || @ Toronto
|  (2OT)
| Tony Parker (32)
| Danny Green (9)
| Tim Duncan (6)
| Air Canada Centre19,800
| 11-3									
|- style="background:#cfc;"								
| 15 || November 26 || @ Washington
| 
| Boris Diaw (16)
| Tiago Splitter (12)
| Tiago Splitter (7)
| Verizon Center13,879
| 12-3								
|- style="background:#cfc;"								
| 16 || November 28 || @ Orlando
| 
| Manu Ginóbili (20)
| Boris Diaw (7)
| Tony Parker (8)
| Amway Center17,271
| 13-3								
|- style="background:#fcc;"							
| 17 || November 29 || @ Miami
| 
| Gary Neal (20)
| Matt Bonner (10)
| Gary Neal (7)
| American Airlines Arena19,703
| 13-4

|- style="background:#cfc;"									
| 18 || December 1 || Memphis
|  (OT)
| Tony Parker (30)
| Tim Duncan (15)
| Tony Parker, Manu Ginóbili (6)
| AT&T Center18,581
| 14-4								
|- style="background:#cfc;"								
| 19 || December 5 || Milwaukee
| 
| Gary Neal, Tony Parker (22)
| Matt Bonner (12)
| Tony Parker (10)
| AT&T Center18,349
| 15-4									
|- style="background:#cfc;"							
| 20 || December 7 || Houston
| 
| Tony Parker (17)
| Tim Duncan (12)
| Tony Parker (7)
| AT&T Center18,581
| 16-4									
|- style="background:#cfc;"							
| 21 || December 8 || @ Charlotte
| 
| Danny Green (23)
| Nando de Colo (8)
| Tony Parker (9)
| Time Warner Cable Arena17,321
| 17-4								
|- style="background:#cfc;"							
| 22 || December 10 || @ Houston
|  (OT)
| Gary Neal (29)
| Tim Duncan (13)
| Tony Parker (12)
| Toyota Center13,959
| 18-4									
|- style="background:#fcc;"								
| 23 || December 12 || @ Utah
| 
| Tony Parker, Tim Duncan (22)
| Tim Duncan (21)
| Tony Parker (7)
| EnergySolutions Arena18,710
| 18-5								
|- style="background:#fcc;"							
| 24 || December 13 || @ Portland
| 
| Tony Parker (21)
| Tiago Splitter (7)
| Manu Ginóbili (7)
| Rose Garden19,118
| 18-6								
|- style="background:#cfc;"							
| 25 || December 15 || Boston
| 
| Tony Parker (22)
| Tim Duncan (12)
| Tony Parker (8)
| AT&T Center18,759
| 19-6									
|- style="background:#fcc;"							
| 26 || December 17 || @ Oklahoma City
| 
| Tony Parker, Nando de Colo (14)
| DeJuan Blair (6)
| Tony Parker (7)
| Chesapeake Energy Arena18,203
| 19-7							
|- style="background:#fcc;"								
| 27 || December 18 || @ Denver
| 
| Tim Duncan (31)
| Tim Duncan (18)
| Tim Duncan, Manu Ginóbili (6)
| Pepsi Center17,092
| 19-8								
|- style="background:#cfc;"								
| 28 || December 21 || New Orleans
| 
| Tony Parker (25)
| Tim Duncan (10)
| Manu Ginóbili (7)
| AT&T Center17,943
| 20-8									
|- style="background:#cfc;"							
| 29 || December 23 || Dallas
| 
| Danny Green (25)
| Tiago Splitter (7)
| Manu Ginóbili (9)
| AT&T Center18,581
| 21-8									
|- style="background:#cfc;"								
| 30 || December 26 || Toronto
| 
| Tim Duncan (15)
| Kawhi Leonard (10)
| Tony Parker (7)
| AT&T Center18,581
| 22-8								
|- style="background:#cfc;"								
| 31 || December 28 || Houston
| 
| Tony Parker (31)
| Tiago Splitter (6)
| Tony Parker (10)
| AT&T Center18,581
| 23-8							
|- style="background:#cfc;"								
| 32 || December 30 || @ Dallas
| 
| Tony Parker (21)
| Tim Duncan (10)
| Tony Parker (9)
| American Airlines Center19,928
| 24-8								
|- style="background:#cfc;"									
| 33 || December 31 || Brooklyn
| 
| Tony Parker (20)
| Boris Diaw (6)
| Tony Parker (6)
| AT&T Center18,581
| 25-8									
|- style="background:;"

|- style="background:#cfc;"							
| 34 || January 2 || @ Milwaukee
| 
| Tim Duncan (28)
| Tim Duncan (13)
| Tony Parker (11)
| BMO Harris Bradley Center15,084
| 26-8									
|- style="background:#fcc;"								
| 35 || January 3 || @ New York
| 
| Gary Neal (12)
| Tim Duncan (6)
| Tony Parker (6)
| Madison Square Garden19,033
| 26-9									
|- style="background:#cfc;"							
| 36 || January 5 || Philadelphia
| 
| Tony Parker (20)
| Tiago Splitter (10)
| Tony Parker (5)
| AT&T Center18,581
| 27-9								
|- style="background:#fcc;"								
| 37 || January 7 || @ New Orleans
| 
| Manu Ginóbili (21)
| Tim Duncan (8)
| Manu Ginóbili (4)
| New Orleans Arena11,599
| 27-10								
|- style="background:#cfc;"								
| 38 || January 9 || L. A. Lakers
| 
| Tony Parker (24)
| Tiago Splitter (14)
| Tony Parker (6)
| AT&T Center18,581
| 28-10								
|- style="background:#fcc;"								
| 39 || January 11 || @ Memphis
|  (OT)
| Tony Parker (30)
| Tim Duncan (11)
| Tony Parker, Manu Ginóbili (5)
| FedExForum17,685
| 28-11								
|- style="background:#cfc;"								
| 40 || January 13 || Minnesota
| 
| Tony Parker (20)
| Tim Duncan (9)
| Tony Parker (6)
| AT&T Center18,144
| 29-11								
|- style="background:#cfc;"								
| 41 || January 16 || Memphis
| 
| Tim Duncan (19)
| Tiago Splitter (9)
| Tony Parker (11)
| AT&T Center18,581
| 30-11									
|- style="background:#cfc;"							
| 42 || January 18 || Golden State
| 
| Tony Parker (25)
| Tim Duncan (10)
| Tony Parker (8)
| AT&T Center18,581
| 31-11									
|- style="background:#cfc;"							
| 43 || January 19 || @ Atlanta
| 
| Tony Parker (23)
| DeJuan Blair, Tiago Splitter (7)
| Tony Parker (17)
| Philips Arena18,255
| 32-11								
|- style="background:#cfc;"								
| 44 || January 21 || @ Philadelphia
| 
| Tim Duncan (24)
| Tim Duncan (17)
| Tony Parker (8)
| Wells Fargo Center15,346
| 33-11									
|- style="background:#cfc;"								
| 45 || January 23 || New Orleans
| 
| Tiago Splitter (25)
| Tiago Splitter, Danny Green (7)
| Tony Parker (13)
| AT&T Center17,511
| 34-11									
|- style="background:#cfc;"								
| 46 || January 25 || @ Dallas
| 
| Tony Parker (23)
| Tiago Splitter (12)
| Tony Parker (10)
| American Airlines Center19,884
| 35-11									
|- style="background:#cfc;"								
| 47 || January 26 || Phoenix
| 
| Tony Parker (31)
| Tiago Splitter (8)
| Tony Parker (7)
| AT&T Center18,581
| 36-11									
|- style="background:#cfc;"								
| 48 || January 30 || Charlotte
| 
| Tony Parker (22)
| Aron Baynes (9)
| Tony Parker (7)
| AT&T Center18,581
| 37-11	

|- style="background:#cfc;"								
| 49 || February 2 || Washington
| 
| Tony Parker (19)
| Kawhi Leonard (11)
| Tony Parker (12)
| AT&T Center18,581
| 38-11									
|- style="background:#cfc;"							
| 50 || February 6 || @ Minnesota
| 
| Tony Parker (31)
| Kawhi Leonard (10)
| Tony Parker (8)
| Target Center15,224
| 39-11										
|- style="background:#fcc;"							
| 51 || February 8 || @ Detroit
| 
| Tony Parker (31)
| DeJuan Blair (10)
| Tony Parker (8)
| The Palace of Auburn Hills17,266
| 39-12										
|- style="background:#cfc;"								
| 52 || February 10 || @ Brooklyn
| 
| Tony Parker (29)
| Tiago Splitter (9)
| Tony Parker (11)
| Barclays Center17,014
| 40-12									
|- style="background:#cfc;"							
| 53 || February 11 || @ Chicago
| 
| Kawhi Leonard (26)
| Danny Green (6)
| Nando de Colo (7)
| United Center21,955
| 41-12										
|- style="background:#cfc;"							
| 54 || February 13 || @ Cleveland
| 
| Tony Parker (24)
| Kawhi Leonard (10)
| Tony Parker (7)
| Quicken Loans Arena12,162
| 42-12		
|- align="center"
|colspan="9" bgcolor="#bbcaff"|All-Star Break
|- style="background:#cfc;"							
| 55 || February 19 || @ Sacramento
| 
| Tony Parker (30)
| Tim Duncan (14)
| Tony Parker (11)
| Power Balance Pavilion14,940
| 43-12									
|- style="background:#cfc;"								
| 56 || February 21 || @ L. A. Clippers
| 
| Tony Parker (31)
| Tim Duncan (5)
| Tony Parker, Danny Green (7)
| Staples Center19,343
| 44-12								
|- style="background:#fcc;"							
| 57 || February 22 || @ Golden State
|  (OT)
| Danny Green (20)
| Tim Duncan (13)
| Tim Duncan, Kawhi Leonard, Tony Parker (3)
| Oracle Arena19,596
| 44-13									
|- style="background:#cfc;"							
| 58 || February 24 || @ Phoenix
| 
| Kawhi Leonard & Patty Mills (16)
| Kawhi Leonard (9)
| Manu Ginóbili (6)
| US Airways Center14,923
| 45-13									
|- style="background:#fcc;"								
| 59 || February 27 || Phoenix
| 
| Tony Parker (22)
| Tim Duncan (11)
| Tony Parker (8)
| AT&T Center17,573
| 45-14

|- style="background:#cfc;"									
| 60 || March 1 || Sacramento
| 
| DeJuan Blair (16)
| Tiago Splitter (11)
| Manu Ginóbili (15)
| AT&T Center18,581
| 46-14								
|- style="background:#cfc;"								
| 61 || March 3 || Detroit
| 
| Manu Ginóbili (17)
| Tim Duncan (11)
| Tim Duncan, Stephen Jackson (6)
| AT&T Center18,581
| 47-14								
|- style="background:#cfc;"							
| 62 || March 6 || Chicago
| 
| Tim Duncan, Manu Ginóbili (18)
| Tim Duncan, Tiago Splitter (10)
| Manu Ginóbili (9)
| AT&T Center18,581
| 48-14										
|- style="background:#fcc;"							
| 63 || March 8 || Portland
| 
| Tim Duncan (18)
| Tim Duncan (8)
| Tiago Splitter, Cory Joseph, Stephen Jackson, Manu Ginóbili, Tim Duncan, Boris Diaw (3)
| AT&T Center18,581
| 48-15									
|- style="background:#cfc;"							
| 64 || March 11 || Oklahoma City
| 
| Tiago Splitter (21)
| Tiago Splitter (10)
| Gary Neal (6)
| AT&T Center18,581
| 49-15										
|- style="background:#fcc;"						
| 65 || March 12 || @ Minnesota
| 
| Cory Joseph (15)
| Tiago Splitter (11)
| Patrick Mills (6)
| Target Center14,219
| 49-16			
|- style="background:#cfc;"
| 66 || March 14 || Dallas
| 
| Tim Duncan (28)
| Tim Duncan (19)
| Manu Ginóbili (9)
| AT&T Center18,581
| 50-16
|- style="background:#cfc;"								
| 67 || March 16 || Cleveland
| 
| Tim Duncan (30)
| Kawhi Leonard (13)
| Manu Ginóbili (10)
| AT&T Center18,581
| 51-16								
|- style="background:#cfc;"						
| 68 || March 20 || Golden State
| 
| Tim Duncan (25)
| Tim Duncan (13)
| Manu Ginóbili (7)
| AT&T Center17,751
| 52-16										
|- style="background:#cfc;"							
| 69 || March 22 || Utah
| 
| Tony Parker (22)
| Tim Duncan (16)
| Tony Parker, Tim Duncan (5)
| AT&T Center18,581
| 53-16									
|- style="background:#fcc;"							
| 70 || March 24 || @ Houston
| 
| Tony Parker (23)
| Tim Duncan (7)
| Tony Parker (7)
| Toyota Center18,245
| 53-17
|- style="background:#cfc;"								
| 71 || March 27 || Denver
| 
| Tim Duncan (23)
| Tim Duncan (14)
| Tony Parker (11)
| AT&T Center18,581
| 54-17								
|- style="background:#cfc;"				
| 72 || March 29 || L. A. Clippers
| 
| Tim Duncan (34)
| Tim Duncan (11)
| Tony Parker (8)
| AT&T Center18,581
| 55-17								
|- style="background:#fcc;"							
| 73 || March 31 || Miami
| 
| Tim Duncan, Kawhi Leonard (17)
| Tim Duncan (12)
| Tony Parker (8)
| AT&T Center18,581
|  55-18									
|- style="background:;"

|- style="background:#fcc;"								
| 74 || April 1 || @ Memphis
| 
| Tony Parker (25)
| Tiago Splitter (11)
| Tony Parker, DeJuan Blair (4)
| FedExForum16,642
| 55-19
|- style="background:#cfc;"								
| 75 || April 3 || Orlando
| 
| Danny Green (20)
| Tiago Splitter (9)
| Nando de Colo (6)
| AT&T Center18,581
| 56-19								
|- style="background:#fcc;"								
| 76 || April 4 || @ Oklahoma City
| 
| Tim Duncan, Kawhi Leonard (24)
| Kawhi Leonard (14)
| Kawhi Leonard (6)
| Chesapeake Energy Arena18,203
| 56-20								
|- style="background:#cfc;"								
| 77 || April 6 || Atlanta
| 
| Tim Duncan (31)
| Tim Duncan (14)
| Kawhi Leonard (4)
| AT&T Center18,581
| 57-20								
|- style="background:#fcc;"						
| 78 || April 10 || @ Denver
| 
| Tim Duncan, Gary Neal (17)
| Kawhi Leonard (11)
| Tiago Splitter, Nando De Colo, Cory Joseph, Patty Mills (4)
| Pepsi Center16,651
| 57-21									
|- style="background:#cfc;"								
| 79 || April 12 || Sacramento
| 
| Tony Parker (22)
| Tiago Splitter (12)
| Tony Parker (10)
| AT&T Center18,581
| 58-21									
|- style="background:#fcc;"							
| 80 || April 14 || @ L. A. Lakers
| 
| Tim Duncan (23)
| Tim Duncan, Tiago Splitter (10)
| Tony Parker (8)
| Staples Center18,997
| 58-22							
|- style="background:#fcc;"							
| 81 || April 15 || @ Golden State
| 
| Gary Neal (25)
| Tiago Splitter (7)
| Nando de Colo (9)
| Oracle Arena19,596
| 58-23								
|- style="background:#fcc;"							
| 82 || April 17 || Minnesota
| 
| Tim Duncan, Gary Neal (17)
| Tim Duncan (14)
| Tony Parker (8)
| AT&T Center18,581
|  58-24

Playoffs

Game log

|- bgcolor=ccffcc
| 1
| April 21
| L. A. Lakers
| 
| Tony Parker, Manu Ginóbili (18)
| Kawhi Leonard (11)
| Tony Parker (8)
| AT&T Center18,581
| 1–0
|- bgcolor=ccffcc
| 2
| April 24
| L. A. Lakers
| 
| Tony Parker (28)
| Kawhi Leonard (7)
| Tony Parker, Manu Ginóbili (7)
| AT&T Center18,581
| 2-0
|- bgcolor=ccffcc
| 3
| April 26
| @ L. A. Lakers
| 
| Tim Duncan (26)
| Tim Duncan (9)
| Tony Parker (7)
| Staples Center18,997
| 3-0
|- bgcolor=ccffcc
| 4
| April 28
| @ L. A. Lakers
| 
| Tony Parker (23)
| Kawhi Leonard (7)
| Manu Ginóbili, Cory Joseph (6)
| Staples Center18,997
| 4-0

|- bgcolor=ccffcc
| 1
| May 6
| Golden State
|  (2OT)
| Tony Parker (28)
| Tim Duncan (11)
| Manu Ginóbili (11)
| AT&T Center18,581
| 1–0
|- bgcolor=ffcccc
| 2
| May 8
| Golden State
| 
| Tim Duncan (23)
| Kawhi Leonard (12)
| Manu Ginóbili (4)
| AT&T Center18,581
| 1–1
|- bgcolor=ccffcc
| 3
| May 10
| @ Golden State
| 
| Tony Parker (32)
| Tim Duncan (10)
| Tony Parker (5)
| Oracle Arena19,596
| 2-1
|- bgcolor=ffcccc
| 4
| May 12
| @ Golden State
| (OT)
| Manu Ginóbili (21)
| Tim Duncan (15)
| Tony Parker, Tiago Splitter, Manu Ginóbili, Boris Diaw (3)
| Oracle Arena19,596
| 2-2
|- bgcolor=ccffcc
| 5
| May 14
| Golden State
| 
| Tony Parker (25)
| Tim Duncan (1)
| Tony Parker (10)
| AT&T Center18,581
| 3-2
|- bgcolor=ccffcc
| 6
| May 16
| @ Golden State
| 
| Tim Duncan (19)
| Kawhi Leonard (10)
| Manu Ginóbili (11)
| Oracle Arena19,596
| 4-2

|- bgcolor=ccffcc
| 1
| May 19
| Memphis
| 
| Tony Parker (20)
| Tim Duncan (10)
| Tony Parker (9)
| AT&T Center18,581
| 1–0
|- bgcolor=ccffcc
| 2
| May 21
| Memphis
|  (OT)
| Tim Duncan (17)
| Tim Duncan, Kawhi Leonard (9)
| Tony Parker (18)
| AT&T Center18,581
| 2-0
|- bgcolor=ccffcc
| 3
| May 25
| @ Memphis
| (OT)
| Tony Parker (26)
| Kawhi Leonard (11)
| Tim Duncan, Tony Parker, Manu Ginóbili (5)
| FedExForum18,119
| 3-0
|- bgcolor=ccffcc
| 4
| May 27
| @ Memphis
| 
| Tony Parker (37)
| Tim Duncan (8)
| Manu Ginóbili, Tony Parker (6)
| FedExForum18,119
| 4-0

|- bgcolor=ccffcc
| 1
| June 6
| @ Miami
| 
| Tony Parker (21)
| Tim Duncan (14)
| Tony Parker (6)
| American Airlines Arena19,775
| 1-0
|- bgcolor=ffcccc
| 2
| June 9
| @ Miami
| 
| Danny Green (17)
| Kawhi Leonard (14)
| Tony Parker (5)
| American Airlines Arena19,900
| 1-1
|- bgcolor=ccffcc
| 3
| June 11
| Miami
| 
| Danny Green (27)
| Tim Duncan (14)
| Tony Parker (8)
| AT&T Center18,581
| 2-1
|- bgcolor=ffcccc
| 4
| June 13
| Miami
| 
| Tim Duncan (20)
| Kawhi Leonard (9)
| Tony Parker (7)
| AT&T Center18,581
| 2-2
|- bgcolor=ccffcc
| 5
| June 16
| Miami
| 
| Tony Parker (26)
| Tim Duncan (12)
| Manu Ginóbili (10)
| AT&T Center18,581
| 3-2
|- bgcolor=#ffcccc
| 6
| June 18
| @ Miami
| (OT)
| Tim Duncan (30)
| Tim Duncan (17)
| Tony Parker (8)
| American Airlines Arena19,900
| 3-3
|- bgcolor=#ffcccc
| 7
| June 20
| @ Miami
| 
| Tim Duncan (24)
| Kawhi Leonard (16)
| Manu Ginóbili (5)
| American Airlines Arena19,900
| 3-4
|-

Player statistics

Regular season

Playoffs

See also

References

San Antonio Spurs seasons
San Antonio Spurs
Western Conference (NBA) championship seasons
San Antonio
San Antonio